Project Runway Season 7 is the seventh season of the television show Project Runway.  The first episode aired on January 14, 2010, on Lifetime.

Season 7 featured the return of the show to New York City, following a move to Los Angeles for Season 6.

Returning as judges are supermodel Heidi Klum, fashion designer Michael Kors, and Marie Claire fashion director Nina Garcia. Tim Gunn returned as a mentor to the aspiring designers.

The winner of this season of Project Runway will receive an editorial feature in an issue of Marie Claire magazine, a cash prize of $100,000 to start his or her own line, an opportunity to sell the line on Bluefly.com, and a $50,000 technology suite from Hewlett-Packard to create, design, and run his or her business.  The winning model of this season will receive a $25,000 cash prize and take part in the winning designer's fashion spread in Marie Claire.

In 2012, Anthony Williams and Mila Hermanovski competed on Project Runway All Stars (season 1), with Anthony placing 9th and Mila placing 6th of 13.

Also in 2012, Emilio Sosa competed on Project Runway All Stars (season 2) and again was the runner-up.

In 2013, Seth Aaron Henderson competed in Project Runway All Stars (season 3) and won the competition.

In 2014, Jay Sario competed in Project Runway All Stars (season 4) placing 6th of 14.

In 2018, Anthony Williams once again competed on Project Runway All Stars (season 6) and won the competition.

In 2019, Seth Aaron Henderson returned for a third time to compete on Project Runway All Stars (season 7) against worldwide Project Runway winners. Seth Aaron placed 13th of 14.

Contestants

Designers

 Anthony was originally eliminated after Amy, but returned to the competition following Maya's withdrawal

Models

Challenges

:  Team Emilio and Seth Aaron co-won Episode 9, for the first time since Season 2.
:  Maya withdrew for personal reasons at the beginning of Episode 11.  Anthony, who was originally eliminated in Episode 10, was brought back to take her place. Also, two winners were chosen for this challenge: Emilio and Anthony. Each of their dresses will be worn on the red carpet by Heidi Klum and Jessica Alba. This is the first time two designers won a single challenge yet were not a team.
:  Emilio was advanced to fashion week first during the judging session. Seth Aaron was also advanced to fashion week. Jay and Mila will both create collections for fashion week, however only one will advance to compete at Bryant Park with Emilio and Seth Aaron.
:  Jay and Mila each presented three looks to the judges. After much deliberation, they concluded that Mila was more ready to show at fashion week than Jay. She advanced to the finale, and Jay was consequently eliminated.

 The designer won Project Runway Season 7.
 The designer was advanced to Fashion Week.
 The designer won the challenge.
 The designer came in second but did not win the challenge.
 The designer had one of the highest scores for that challenge, but did not win.
 The designer had one of the lowest scores for that challenge, but was not eliminated.
 The designer was in the bottom two, but was not eliminated.
 The designer lost and was out of the competition.
 The designer withdrew from the competition.

Models of the Runway

:  The aftershow "Models of the Runway" fully reveals the eliminated model of a future challenge.
:  The table does not show the results of the designers' model pick, in which everyone kept the same model, but the start of Project Runway episode 2, in which the models chose the designers. Alexis switched from Mila to Anthony, causing Alison and Valeria to have to switch and leaving Lorena with Mila
:  In place of the models, a group of women with heart disease modeled the designs. Colored boxes in this column refer to the models assigned to the winning and losing designers.
: In this episode the models walk the runway with 5- to 9-year-old girls.
:  Cerri was originally eliminated in Episode 10; however, she was brought back after Valeria, Seth Aaron's model, voluntarily withdrew to accept a job at Donna Karan.
: Only Brandise and Brittany walked the runway because their designers Mila and Jay had to compete for the final slot at Fashion Week.
: In this challenge designers worked in pairs, and some models wore looks designed by their designers' teammate. 
:Holly was paired with eliminated designer Amy, but it was actually Cerri who wore the losing design.

 The model won Project Runway Season 7.
 The model wore the winning design that challenge.
 The model wore the losing design that challenge.
 The model was eliminated.
 The model was brought back into the competition.
 The model withdrew from the competition.

Designer legend
Amy: AS
Anna: AL
Anthony: AW
Ben: BC
Christiane: CK
Emilio: ES
Janeane: JC
Jay: JS
Jesse: JL
Jesus: JE
Jonathan: JP
Maya: ML
Mila: MH
Pamela: PP
Ping: PW
Seth Aaron: SH

Episodes

Episode 1: Back to New York
Original Airdate: January 14, 2010

The designers were asked to create a garment that represents who they are as a designer. They selected five fabrics each from a wide selection provided by Mood. The designers were preassigned models for their challenge and given one day to complete their design.

Guest Judge: Nicole Richie
WINNER: Emilio
BOTTOM TWO: Christiane King & Jesus Estrada
ELIMINATED: Christiane

Episode 2: The Fashion Farm
Original Airdate: January 21, 2010

The designers were asked to create a party look from a burlap potato sack for their models to wear to an industry event. As the clients for this round, the models were allowed to choose their designers.

Guest Judge: Lauren Hutton
WINNER: Jay
BOTTOM TWO: Pamela Ptak & Jesus Estrada
ELIMINATED: Pamela

Episode 3: The Highs and Lows of Fashion
Original Airdate: January 28, 2010

The designers were taken to the Metropolitan Museum of Art and shown ten iconic looks by famous designers such as Yves Saint Laurent, Christian Dior, Madame Grès, and Cristóbal Balenciaga. They were then asked to create a high-end signature look worthy of a master collection. The designers were placed in teams of two and given $500 per team to create their looks. As the winner of the last challenge, Jay was automatically a team leader. Tim drew the names of the other team leaders via a random lottery; those team leaders then selected their partners in the order they were chosen, as indicated in the table below.

On the second day of the challenge, the teams were asked to create a second "look for less", using only 10% of the budget for the first look and inspired by the signature look of one of the other teams. Heidi mentioned, when about to eliminate one of the bottom four designers, that two of them might be out.

Guest Judge: Matthew Williamson
WINNER: Mila
BOTTOM TWO: Anthony Willams & Ping Wu
ELIMINATED: Ping

Episode 4: Design Your Heart Out
Original Airdate: February 4, 2010

The designers were asked to design a look for a Fashion Week gala. The looks were required to feature the color red and elements with Campbell's branding, and were modeled by women who had been impacted by heart disease. Designers had a budget of $100 to purchase fabrics and other elements and one day of time to finish the design. The winning garment was produced and sold on projectrunway.com, with proceeds going to the American Heart Association.

Guest Judge: Georgina Chapman
WINNER: Amy
BOTTOM TWO: Anna Lynett& Jesus Estrada
ELIMINATED: Jesus

Episode 5: Run for Cover
Original Airdate: February 11, 2010

The designers were asked to design an outfit for the cover of Marie Claire magazine. The winning design was worn by Heidi Klum on the cover of the April 2010 issue.

Guest Judge: Joanna Coles, editor in chief of Marie Claire
WINNER: Anthony
ELIMINATED: Anna

Episode 6: A Little Bit of Fashion
Original Airdate: February 18, 2010

The designers were asked to create a fashionable children's look to be modeled by a group of girls aged 5–9. Later the designers were asked to create an additional companion look for their adult models.

Guest Judge: Tory Burch
WINNER: Seth Aaron
ELIMINATED: Janeane

Episode 7: Hard Wear
Original Airdate: March 4, 2010

The designers were asked to create an innovative look and an accessory from materials sourced from a hardware store.

Guest Judges: Isabel Toledo and Stephen Webster, jewelry designer
WINNER: Jay
ELIMINATED: Jesse

Episode 8: The Elements of Fashion
Original Airdate: March 11, 2010

The designers were asked to create a look inspired by one of the four classical elements: Earth, Water, Air, and Fire.

As the winner of the last challenge, Jay was allowed to choose his own element. After that, two designers were allotted to each element. The designers got to choose their element in the order in which Tim drew their names out of a bag.

The designers and their elements were as follows:

Guest Judge: Roland Mouret
WINNER: Jonathan
ELIMINATED: Ben

Episode 9: Takin' It To The Streets
Original Airdate: March 18, 2010

The designers were asked to create looks inspired by a distinctive New York City neighborhood. They were divided into four teams of two, with Tim drawing the names of team leaders at random. Each team was responsible for creating a day look and an evening look.

The teams and their neighborhoods were as follows (team leaders are named first):

Guest Judges: Francisco Costa (sitting in for Michael Kors) and Molly Sims
WINNERS: Seth Aaron and Emilio
ELIMINATED: Amy

Episode 10: Hey, That's My Fabric
Original Airdate: March 25, 2010

The designers were asked to design and create their own print fabric as the basis for their looks.

Guest Judge: Vivienne Tam
WINNER: Emilio
ELIMINATED: Anthony

Episode 11: Sew Much Pressure
Original Airdate: April 1, 2010

The designers were asked to create a red-carpet look for Heidi Klum.

Maya chose to withdraw from the competition because she felt that she was too young and was not developed enough as a designer. Since Maya withdrew from the competition, Anthony was brought back, and won the challenge along with Emilio.

Guest Judge: Jessica Alba
 WINNERS: Emilio and Anthony
 ELIMINATED: Jonathan
WITHDREW: Maya
This challenge marked a record-breaking third consecutive win for Emilio.

Episode 12: The Big, Top Designers
Original Airdate: April 8, 2010

The designers were asked to create a look inspired by the Ringling Brothers and Barnum & Bailey Circus.

Guest Judge: Cynthia Rowley
 ADVANCED: Emilio and Seth Aaron
 ELIMINATED: Anthony

Jay and Mila were both kept in the competition and asked to design collections, but only one of them would show at Fashion Week.
This challenge boosted Emilio's own record from three consecutive wins to four.

Episode 13: Finale – Part 1
Original Airdate: April 15, 2010

Four designers were given budget of $9000 and four months to finish a ten piece collection for New York Fashion Week. Tim Gunn visited the four remaining designers as they worked on their collections at home.  When the designers returned to New York, Mila and Jay were asked to show three looks on the runway for the judges to decide which one of them would show at Fashion Week.

 ADVANCED: Mila
 ELIMINATED: Jay
 Had Jay been chosen rather than Mila, there would have been an all-male final following two all-female ones.

Episode 14: Finale – Part 2
Original Airdate: April 22, 2010

Three finalists work the last part of preparation, including model casting and hair and makeup counseling, for the final New York Fashion Week. Each showed their collection at Fashion Week before the winner of Project Runway Season 7 was announced. Although not televised, all the seasons contestants showed collections to prevent the audience from leaking the identities of the three finalists.

Guest Judge: Faith Hill
WINNER: Seth Aaron
ELIMINATED: Mila and Emilio

Episode 15: Reunion Special
Original Airdate: April 22, 2010

A half-hour show after airing of Project Runway Season 7 Finale, hosted by Tim Gunn and Nina Garcia. All 16 designers and 16 models gathered together to talk about the events on the show and off camera scenes. There are a few highlights in this reunion episode: Designers being disloyal to their models, the conflict between Ping and Jesse, Anthony's controversial comments about Mila, Cerri's negative comments about Jay's design, Maya's withdrawal from competition, and others. Maya was also awarded the Fan Favourite prize.

References

External links
 Project Runway Season 7 Website on MyLifetime.com

Season 07
2010 American television seasons
2010 in fashion